"Same Ol' Shit", sometimes censored as "Same Ol'", is the first single released from MC Ren's debut solo album, Shock of the Hour. It was released on October 29, 1993 and was produced by Tootie. "Same Ol' Shit" became MC Ren's most successful single chart-wise by making it to #90 on the Billboard Hot 100, his only single to make it to that chart.

Single track listing

A-Side
"Same Ol' Shit" (Radio Version)- 3:59  
"Same Ol' Shit" (Instrumental)- 6:03

B-Side
"Same Ol' Shit" (Album Version)- 4:08

Charts

References

1993 singles
1993 songs
MC Ren songs
Ruthless Records singles
Gangsta rap songs
Songs written by MC Ren